Oakfield is a census-designated place (CDP) and the primary village in the town of Oakfield, Aroostook County, Maine, United States. It is in the northwest corner of the town, on both sides of the East Branch Mattawamkeag River. Interstate 95 passes through the CDP north of the village center, with access from Exit 286 (River Road). I-95 leads east  to the Canada–United States border at Houlton, and southwest  to Bangor.

Oakfield was first listed as a CDP prior to the 2020 census.

Demographics

References 

Census-designated places in Aroostook County, Maine
Census-designated places in Maine